The Alexandru Ioan Cuza University (Romanian: Universitatea „Alexandru Ioan Cuza"; acronym: UAIC) is a public university located in Iași, Romania. Founded by an 1860 decree of Prince Alexandru Ioan Cuza, under whom the former Academia Mihăileană was converted to a university, the University of Iași, as it was named at first, is one of the oldest universities of Romania, and one of its advanced research and education institutions. It is one of the five members of the Universitaria Consortium (the group of elite Romanian universities).

The Alexandru Ioan Cuza University offers study programmes in Romanian, English, and French. In 2008, for the third year in a row, it was placed first in the national research ranking compiled on the basis of Shanghai criteria. In the 2012 QS World University Rankings, Alexandru Ioan Cuza University was included in the Top 700 universities of the world, on the position 601+ , together with three other Romanian universities.

The university is a member of some of the most important university networks and associations: the Coimbra Group (CG), Utrecht Network, European University Association (EUA), International Association of Universities (IAU), University Agency of Francophony (AUF), and the Network of Francophone Universities (RUFAC).

History

Iași has a long tradition in higher education, the first institute that functioned on the territory of Romania was Academia Vasiliană founded in 1640 by the Moldavian Prince Vasile Lupu, followed, in 1707, by Princely Academy of Iași. The Princely Academy (renamed, in 1812, The Academy of Filology and Science) matched up to the standards of the other European Academies of the time and the Romanian language gained importance over the Greek language.

The foundation, in 1835, of the Academia Mihăileană is considered a landmark in the history of Romanian higher education. The Academia Mihăileană was created under the auspices of Prince Mihail Sturdza (hence its name), striving for progress and for "meeting the standards of the enlightened Europe". Three faculties were set up: the Faculty of Law, the Faculty of Philosophy and the Faculty of Theology and the curriculum resembled to a great extent that of Austrian and German academies.

After the Unification of the Romanian Principalities of Moldavia and Wallachia by the Prince Alexandru Ioan Cuza, the inauguration, at 26 October 1860, of the University of Iași, the first Romanian modern university, was to be a stepping stone to modern higher education in Romania.

By 1879, the University of Iași had four faculties: Law, Letters and Philosophy, Sciences, and Medicine. In 1892, the Faculty of Sciences added the Department of Organic and Inorganic Chemistry, followed by the Department of Agricultural Chemistry, in 1906, and the School of the Industrial Electricity, in 1910.

In March 1937, the technical higher education departments and the Faculty of Agricultural Sciences were transferred to the newly established Gheorghe Asachi Polytechnic School, and in 1948, the Medical School became the independent Institute of Medicine and Pharmacy of Iași.

Blazon
Its coat of arms with the Y shaped heraldic pall symbolizes the three initiatives which led to the foundation of the university: the Academia Vasiliană, the Academia Mihăileană, the University of Iași. The central element is the Bible, the classic emblem of higher education. The three shiny stars stand for the three faculties of the university at its foundation moment, Philosophy, Law and Theology, on blue and argent background, the same colors used on the Cuza family shield.

Grounds

The university grounds lie on Copou Hill in the northern part of the city.

The main university building, known as the University Palace, was erected between 1893 and 1897, and extended in 1933–1937, on the site of the first Iași National Theatre which had burned down in 1888. The Hall of the university, known as The Hall of the Lost Footsteps, served as a parliamentary debating chamber between 1917 and 1918 when, during the Great War, Iași was the capital of Romania. In 1968–1978, the painter Sabin Bălaşa created a series of strongly romanticized frescoes for the arcades. The University Palace is shared with the Gheorghe Asachi Technical University.

Academics

Nowadays, Alexandru Ioan Cuza University is made up of 15 faculties and one department:

 The Faculty of Biology, founded in 1864 as a department of the Faculty of Sciences, became part of the Faculty of Natural Sciences in 1948, and organized as faculty in 1990. 
 The Faculty of Chemistry was founded in 1864 as a department of the Faculty of Sciences, and organized as faculty in 1948. It offers programs in chemistry, technological biochemistry, and medical chemistry. 
 The Faculty of Computer Science was founded in 1965, as the Department of Computing Machines of the Faculty of Mathematics. In 1991, it became the first faculty in Computer Science of a non-technical university in Romania. 
 The Faculty of Economics and Business Administration, founded in 1962 (as the Faculty of Economics). 
 The Faculty of Geography and Geology, founded in 1865 as the Department of Geology-Mineralogy of the Faculty of Sciences. In 1948, it became part of the Faculty of Natural Sciences, and organized as the Faculty of Biology-Geography-Geology, in 1977. 
 The Faculty of History, founded in 1860 as a department of the Faculty of Philosophy. It was part of the Faculties of History-Geography, Letters, or History-Philosophy until 1990, when it was organized as an individual faculty. 
 The Faculty of Law, founded in 1856, it is one of the founder faculties. 
 The Faculty of Letters, founded in 1860, as part of the Faculty of Philosophy, renamed in 1864 as Faculty of Philosophy and Letters. It became an individual faculty in 1960.
 The Faculty of Mathematics, was founded in 1864 as a department of the Faculty of Sciences, and organized as faculty in 1948. 
 The Faculty of Philosophy and Social-Political Sciences, founded in 1856 as the Faculty of Philosophy, became one of the founder faculties. 
 The Faculty of Physical Education and Sports, founded in 1960. 
 The Faculty of Physics, was founded in 1864 as a department of the Faculty of Sciences, and organized as faculty in 1962. It offers programs in physics, medical physics, biophysics, computational physics and engineering physics. 
 The Faculty of Psychology and Education Sciences, founded as the Departments of Pedagogy and Psychology starting 1878, it became a faculty in 1997. 
 The Faculty of Orthodox Theology, founded in 1860, as one of the founder faculties.  
 The Faculty of Catholic Theology, founded in 2002. 
 Centre for European Studies, founded in 2000.

Library
Founded in 1835 as Library of the Academia Mihăileană, Mihai Eminescu Central University Library holds about 2.5 million volumes that form the main collection and an old and rare collection, from the 15th to the 19th centuries, of over 100,000 Romanian and foreign documents, manuscripts, books, albums, maps, stamps, archive items.

The building that houses the main collection is located at the base of Copou Hill, and it was built between 1930 and 1934 to serve as the headquarters of King Ferdinand's Cultural Foundation. The triangular building with Doric columns and cupola is decorated with Carrara marble and Venetian mosaics. By 1945, the Foundation library had become one of the biggest in the country. Today, the library is the largest in Moldavia, with a great number of manuscripts and old books.

Research
Alexandru Ioan Cuza University is involved in over 400 national and international research projects, with the logistic support of 24 research centres.

International relations
The university is a member of different university networks and associations, such as the Coimbra Group, the European University Association, the Utrecht Network, the International Association of Universities, or the Agence universitaire de la Francophonie.

Gallery

Faculty, alumni and rectors

See also
 Academia Mihăileană
 List of modern universities in Europe (1801–1945)
 Utrecht Network

References

External links

 "Al. I. Cuza" University of Iași Website
 

 
Iasi, University of
Cuza
Alexandru Ioan Cuza University
University
University
1860 establishments in Romania